is a Japanese voice actress from Tokyo, Japan. She voices Mayu Tamano for the Rumbling Hearts visual novel and anime series as well as the web anime Ayumayu Gekijou.

Filmography

Anime
Boogiepop Phantom (Rie Takai)
Cyber Team in Akihabara (Suzume Sakurajosui)
Eden's Bowy (Sakura)
Futakoi (Ui Chigusa)
Futakoi Alternative (Ui Chigusa)
Geneshaft (Natasha)
Hanaukyo Maid Team La Verite (Lemon)
Himesama Goyōjin (Aoi Misuzu)
Kaikan Phase (Yuko)
Kamichama Karin (Himeka Karasuma)
Rumbling Hearts (credited as Kyouko Yoshida; Mayu Tamano)
Magic User's Club (Naomi)
Ouran High School Host Club (Renge Houshakuji)
Raimuiro Ryukitan X (Aya Nabeshima)

OVA
Akane Maniax (Mayu Tamano)
Magic User's Club (Naomi)
Mizuiro (Mutsuki Shindo)
Photon (Koro-chan)
Denpa teki na Kanojo (Hikaru Ochibana)

Film
Cyber Team in Akihabara - 2011 Summer Vacation (Suzume Sakurajosui)

Drama CDs
Ze (Benio)

Video games
Eiyuu Shigan (Kozue)
Futakoi (Ui Chigusa)
Glint Glitters (Miki & Tama)
I/O (Masami Shinozuka, Mayumi Shinozuka)
Kazoku Keikaku (Matsuri Kawahara)
Little Lovers (Kazue Ikeda)
Love & Destroy (Kiki)
Mizuiro (Mutsuki Shindo)
Muv-Luv Alternative (Yuuhi Koubuin & Yuuhi Mitsurugi)
Star Ocean: Till the End of Time (Clair Lasbard)
Tokyo Majin Gakuen Kenpucho (Sayo Hirasaka)
Vampire Savior (Emily)

References

External links
 
Kozue Yoshizumi at Ryu's Seiyuu Infos

1979 births
Living people
Arts Vision voice actors
Japanese video game actresses
Japanese voice actresses
Voice actresses from Tokyo
21st-century Japanese actresses